Sentimientos Ajenos (English: Feelings of Others) is a Mexican telenovela produced by José Alberto Castro for Televisa. It aired on Canal de las Estrellas from Monday August 19, 1996 to Friday January 3, 1997, and it is based on radionovela Dos mujeres y un hombre, written by Arturo Moya Grau.

Yolanda Andrade and Carlos Ponce starred as protagonists, while Chantal Andere starred as main antagonist.

Plot
Sentimientos Ajenos is the story of Sofía, a sweet young painter who falls in love with Renato with no idea that her love would release a tide of hatred from her own sister. Leonor will let nothing keep her from her goal of preventing their marriage and failing that, she tries a million ways to steal her sister's husband, something which sends their father to his grave. Up to her tricks, Leonor seduces an impetuous and passionate young man while masquerading as Sofia. When Renato discovers the supposed affair between his wife and Humberto, he bitterly throws her from the house. Confused and hurt, Sofia must fight to recover her life from the grasp of an enemy whom she would never expect.

Cast
 
Yolanda Andrade as Sofía
Carlos Ponce as Renato Aramendia
Chantal Andere as Leonor de la Huerta Herrera - sister of Sofía, villain
Olivia Bucio as Eva Barrientos - godmother of Renato and mother of Gerardo
Arsenio Campos as Joaquín - in love with Leonor
Mario Cimarro as Ramiro - friend of Dario, villain
Lourdes Deschamps† as Raquel - in love with Ramiro, villain
Isaura Espinoza as Aurora Mendiola - mother of Dario
Ernesto Godoy as Gerardo Barrientos -brother of Renato
Carmelita González† as Inés - housekeeper at Sofía's house
Susana González as Norma - best friend of Sofía
Aarón Hernán† as Andrés Barrientos - godfather of Renato and father of Gerardo
Gloria Izaguirre as Lucha - housekeeper at Barrientos house
Manuel Landeta as Miguel Ángel - in love with Sofía
Ana Bertha Lepe† as Teresa - owner of guesthouse
Adalberto Martínez as Pedro - gardener at Barrientos house
Orlando Miguel as Darío Mendiola - lover of Leonor, villain
Marcela Matos as Malena - girlfriend of Gerardo, villain
Edith Márquez as Marcela - sister of Humberto
Javier Ortiz as Humberto - in love with Leonor
Katia del Río as Delia - girlfriend of Ramiro, villain
Héctor Sáez as Fernando - father of Malena
Edi Xol as Felipe Bonilla - lawyer
Gabriela Arroyo as Judith - therapist of Marcela, in love with Humberto
José Elías Moreno as José María de la Huerta - father of Sofía and Leonor
Antonio Miguel as Father Efraín - priest who helps Sofía
Dina de Marco† as Donata - helps Sofía
Dolores Beristáin† as Graciana - sister of Donata
José Viller as Ernesto
Marisol del Olmo as Lupita
Eduardo Lugo as Don Jesús
Alejandra Jurado as Amalia
Gustavo Negrete
Enrike Palma
Héctor Rubio
Tomás Leal
Sergio Márquez
Fernanda Franco
Manuel Cepeda
José Luis Llamas
Susana Contreras
Rubén Gondray

Awards

References

External links

1996 telenovelas
Mexican telenovelas
1996 Mexican television series debuts
1997 Mexican television series endings
Spanish-language telenovelas
Television shows set in Mexico
Televisa telenovelas